Illinois was admitted to the Union on December 3, 1818, and has been represented in the United States Senate by 47 senators. Senators from Illinois are elected to Class 2 and Class 3.

The Senate twice refused to seat Frank L. Smith, in December 1926 for an appointed term and in March 1927 for an elected one, due to corruption, but he is included in this list because Smith and the Governor considered him to be a senator for approximately two years.

Of the eight African Americans ever to sit in the U.S. Senate since Reconstruction, three have held Illinois's Class 3 seat, including Barack Obama who went on to become the president of the United States. This makes Illinois the state with the most African-American senators. Illinois's current U.S. senators are Democrats Dick Durbin (serving since 1997) and Tammy Duckworth (serving since 2017).

List of senators

|- style="height:2em"
! rowspan=8 | 1
| rowspan=8 align=left | Jesse B. Thomas
| rowspan=6  | Democratic-Republican
| rowspan=8 nowrap | Dec 3, 1818 –Mar 3, 1829
| rowspan=3 | Elected in 1818.
| rowspan=3 | 1
| 
| 1
| Elected in 1818.
| rowspan=4 nowrap | Dec 3, 1818 –Mar 3, 1824
| rowspan=4  | Democratic-Republican
| rowspan=4 align=right | Ninian Edwards
! rowspan=4 | 1

|- style="height:2em"
| 
| rowspan=5 | 2
| rowspan=3 | Re-elected in 1819.Resigned.

|- style="height:2em"
| 

|- style="height:2em"
| rowspan=5 | Re-elected in 1823.Retired.
| rowspan=5 | 2
| 

|- style="height:2em"
|  
| nowrap | Mar 4, 1824 –Nov 24, 1824
| colspan=3 | Vacant

|- style="height:2em"
| Elected to finish Edwards's term.Retired.
| nowrap | Nov 24, 1824 –Mar 3, 1825
|  | Democratic-Republican
| align=right | John McLean
! 2

|- style="height:2em"
| rowspan=2  | NationalRepublican
| 
| rowspan=6 | 3
| rowspan=6 | Elected in 1825.
| rowspan=9 nowrap | Mar 4, 1825 –Dec 12, 1835
| rowspan=9  | Jacksonian
| rowspan=9 align=right | Elias Kane
! rowspan=9 | 3

|- style="height:2em"
| 

|- style="height:2em"
! 2
| align=left | John McLean
|  | Jacksonian
| nowrap | Mar 4, 1829 –Oct 14, 1830
| Elected in 1829.Died.
| rowspan=6 | 3
| 

|- style="height:2em"
| colspan=3 | Vacant
| nowrap | Oct 14, 1830 –Nov 12, 1830
|  

|- style="height:2em"
! 3
| align=left | David J. Baker
|  | Jacksonian
| nowrap | Nov 12, 1830 –Dec 11, 1830
| Appointed to continue McLean's term.Retired.

|- style="height:2em"
! rowspan=8 | 4
| rowspan=8 align=left | John M. Robinson
| rowspan=6  | Jacksonian
| rowspan=8 nowrap | Dec 11, 1830 –Mar 3, 1841
| rowspan=3 | Elected to finish McLean's term.

|- style="height:2em"
| 
| rowspan=5 | 4
| rowspan=3 | Re-elected in 1831.Died.

|- style="height:2em"
| 

|- style="height:2em"
| rowspan=5 | Re-elected in 1835.Retired.
| rowspan=5 | 4
| 

|- style="height:2em"
|  
| nowrap | Dec 12, 1835 –Dec 30, 1835
| colspan=3 | Vacant

|- style="height:2em"
| Appointed to finish Kane's term.Lost election to full term.
| nowrap | Dec 30, 1835 –Mar 3, 1837
|  | Jacksonian
| align=right | William Lee D. Ewing
! 4

|- style="height:2em"
| rowspan=2  | Democratic
| 
| rowspan=3 | 5
| rowspan=3 | Elected in 1837.Retired.
| rowspan=3 nowrap | Mar 4, 1837 –Mar 3, 1843
| rowspan=3  | Democratic
| rowspan=3 align=right | Richard M. Young
! rowspan=3 | 5

|- style="height:2em"
| 

|- style="height:2em"
! rowspan=2 | 5
| rowspan=2 align=left | Samuel McRoberts
| rowspan=2  | Democratic
| rowspan=2 nowrap | Mar 4, 1841 –Mar 27, 1843
| rowspan=2 | Elected in 1841.Died.
| rowspan=5 | 5
| 

|- style="height:2em"
| 
| rowspan=5 | 6
| rowspan=5 | Elected in 1843.Lost renomination.
| rowspan=5 nowrap | Mar 4, 1843 –Mar 3, 1849
| rowspan=5  | Democratic
| rowspan=5 align=right | Sidney Breese
! rowspan=5 | 6

|- style="height:2em"
| colspan=3 | Vacant
| nowrap | Mar 27, 1843 –Aug 16, 1843
|  

|- style="height:2em"
! rowspan=2 | 6
| rowspan=2 align=left | James Semple
| rowspan=2  | Democratic
| rowspan=2 nowrap | Aug 16, 1843 –Mar 3, 1847
| rowspan=2 | Appointed to continue McRoberts's term.Elected in 1844 to finish McRoberts's term.Retired.

|- style="height:2em"
| 

|- style="height:2em"
! rowspan=10 | 7
| rowspan=10 align=left | Stephen A. Douglas
| rowspan=10  | Democratic
| rowspan=10 nowrap | Mar 4, 1847 –Jun 3, 1861
| rowspan=5 | Elected in 1846.
| rowspan=5 | 6
| 

|- style="height:2em"
| 
| rowspan=5 | 7
| Elected in 1849.Election voided.
| nowrap | Mar 4, 1849 –Mar 15, 1849
|  | Democratic
| align=right | James Shields
! rowspan=5 | 7

|- style="height:2em"
|  
| nowrap | Mar 15, 1849 –Oct 27, 1849
| colspan=2 | Vacant

|- style="height:2em"
| rowspan=3 | Elected to finish his own term.Lost re-election.
| rowspan=3 nowrap | Oct 27, 1849 –Mar 3, 1855
| rowspan=3  | Democratic
| rowspan=3 align=right | James Shields

|- style="height:2em"
| 

|- style="height:2em"
| rowspan=3 | Re-elected in 1852.
| rowspan=3 | 7
| 

|- style="height:2em"
| 
| rowspan=3 | 8
| rowspan=3 | Elected in 1855.
| rowspan=12 nowrap | Mar 4, 1855 –Mar 3, 1873
|  | Democratic
| rowspan=12 align=right | Lyman Trumbull
! rowspan=12 | 8

|- style="height:2em"
| 
| rowspan=10  | Republican

|- style="height:2em"
| rowspan=2 | Re-elected in 1859.Died.
| rowspan=6 | 8
| 

|- style="height:2em"
| 
| rowspan=6 | 9
| rowspan=6 | Re-elected in 1861.

|- style="height:2em"
| colspan=3 | Vacant
| nowrap | Jun 3, 1861 –Jun 26, 1861
|  

|- style="height:2em"
! 8
| align=left | Orville Browning
|  | Republican
| nowrap | Jun 26, 1861 –Jan 12, 1863
| Appointed to continue Douglas's term.Retired.

|- style="height:2em"
! rowspan=2 | 9
| rowspan=2 align=left | William A. Richardson
| rowspan=2  |Democratic
| rowspan=2 nowrap | Jan 12, 1863 –Mar 3, 1865
| rowspan=2 | Elected to finish Douglas's term.Retired.

|- style="height:2em"
| 

|- style="height:2em"
! rowspan=3 | 10
| rowspan=3 align=left | Richard Yates
| rowspan=3  | Republican
| rowspan=3 nowrap | Mar 4, 1865 –Mar 3, 1871
| rowspan=3 | Elected in 1864 or 1865.Retired.
| rowspan=3 | 9
| 

|- style="height:2em"
| 
| rowspan=3 | 10
| rowspan=3 | Re-elected in 1867.

|- style="height:2em"
| 

|- style="height:2em"
! rowspan=3 | 11
| rowspan=3 align=left | John A. Logan
| rowspan=3  | Republican
| rowspan=3 nowrap | Mar 4, 1871 –Mar 3, 1877
| rowspan=3 | Elected in 1870 or 1871.Lost re-election.
| rowspan=3 | 10
| 
|  | LiberalRepublican

|- style="height:2em"
| 
| rowspan=3 | 11
| rowspan=3 | Elected in 1873.Retired.
| rowspan=3 nowrap | Mar 4, 1873 –Mar 3, 1879
| rowspan=3  | Republican
| rowspan=3 align=right | Richard J. Oglesby
! rowspan=3 | 9

|- style="height:2em"
| 

|- style="height:2em"
! rowspan=3 | 12
| rowspan=3 align=left | David Davis
| rowspan=3  | Independent
| rowspan=3 nowrap | Mar 4, 1877 –Mar 3, 1883
| rowspan=3 | Elected in 1877.Retired.
| rowspan=3 | 11
| 

|- style="height:2em"
| 
| rowspan=3 | 12
| rowspan=3 | Elected in 1879.
| rowspan=3 nowrap | Mar 4, 1879 –Mar 3, 1885
| rowspan=3  | Republican
| rowspan=3 align=right | John A. Logan
! rowspan=5 | 10

|- style="height:2em"
| 

|- style="height:2em"
! rowspan=20 | 13
| rowspan=20 align=left | Shelby Moore Cullom
| rowspan=20  | Republican
| rowspan=20 nowrap | Mar 4, 1883 –Mar 3, 1913
| rowspan=6 | Elected in 1882.
| rowspan=6 | 12
| 

|- style="height:2em"
| 
| rowspan=6 | 13
| Legislature failed to elect.
| nowrap | Mar 4, 1885 –May 18, 1885
| colspan=2 | Vacant

|- style="height:2em"
| Re-elected late in 1885.Died.
| nowrap | May 19, 1885 –Dec 26, 1886
|  | Republican
| align=right | John A. Logan

|- style="height:2em"
|  
| nowrap | Dec 26, 1886 –Jan 19, 1887
| colspan=3 | Vacant

|- style="height:2em"
| rowspan=3 | Elected to finish Logan's term.Retired.
| rowspan=3 nowrap | Jan 19, 1887 –Mar 3, 1891
| rowspan=3  | Republican
| rowspan=3 align=right | Charles Farwell
! rowspan=3 | 11

|- style="height:2em"
| 

|- style="height:2em"
| rowspan=3 | Re-elected in 1888.
| rowspan=3 | 13
| 

|- style="height:2em"
| 
| rowspan=3 | 14
| rowspan=3 | Elected in 1890.Retired.
| rowspan=3 nowrap | Mar 4, 1891 –Mar 3, 1897
| rowspan=3  | Democratic
| rowspan=3 align=right | John Palmer
! rowspan=3 | 12

|- style="height:2em"
| 

|- style="height:2em"
| rowspan=3 | Re-elected in 1894.
| rowspan=3 | 14
| 

|- style="height:2em"
| 
| rowspan=3 | 15
| rowspan=3 | Elected in 1897.Retired.
| rowspan=3 nowrap | Mar 4, 1897 –Mar 3, 1903
| rowspan=3  | Republican
| rowspan=3 align=right | William Mason
! rowspan=3 | 13

|- style="height:2em"
| 

|- style="height:2em"
| rowspan=3 | Re-elected in 1901.
| rowspan=3 | 15
| 

|- style="height:2em"
| 
| rowspan=3 | 16
| rowspan=3 | Elected in 1903.Lost re-election.
| rowspan=3 nowrap | Mar 4, 1903 –Mar 3, 1909
| rowspan=3  | Republican
| rowspan=3 align=right | Albert Hopkins
! rowspan=3 | 14

|- style="height:2em"
| 

|- style="height:2em"
| rowspan=5 | Re-elected in 1907.Lost renomination.
| rowspan=5 | 16
| 

|- style="height:2em"
| 
| rowspan=6 | 17
|  
| nowrap | Mar 4, 1909 –Jun 18, 1909
| colspan=3 | Vacant

|- style="height:2em"
| rowspan=2 | Elected in 1909, but ineligible until resignation from U.S. House.Election voided.
| rowspan=2 nowrap | Jun 18, 1909 –Jul 13, 1912
| rowspan=2  | Republican
| rowspan=2 align=right | William Lorimer
! rowspan=2 | 15

|- style="height:2em"
| rowspan=2 

|- style="height:2em"
| rowspan=2 |  
| rowspan=2 nowrap | Jul 13, 1912 –Mar 26, 1913
| rowspan=2 colspan=3 | Vacant

|- style="height:2em"
| colspan=3 | Vacant
| nowrap | Mar 4, 1913 –Mar 26, 1913
| Legislature elected late.
| rowspan=4 | 17
| 

|- style="height:2em"
! rowspan=3 | 14
| rowspan=3 align=left | J. Hamilton Lewis
| rowspan=3  | Democratic
| rowspan=3 nowrap | Mar 26, 1913 –Mar 3, 1919
| rowspan=3 | Elected late in 1913.Lost re-election.
| Elected in 1913 to finish Lorimer's term.
| rowspan=4 nowrap | Mar 26, 1913 –Mar 3, 1921
| rowspan=4  | Republican
| rowspan=4 align=right | Lawrence Yates Sherman
! rowspan=4 | 16

|- style="height:2em"
| 
| rowspan=3 | 18
| rowspan=3 | Re-elected in 1914.Retired.

|- style="height:2em"
| 

|- style="height:2em"
! rowspan=3 | 15
| rowspan=3 align=left | Medill McCormick
| rowspan=3  | Republican
| rowspan=3 nowrap | Mar 4, 1919 –Feb 25, 1925
| rowspan=3 | Elected in 1918.Lost renomination and died just before the end of the term.
| rowspan=4 | 18
| 

|- style="height:2em"
| 
| rowspan=6 | 19
| rowspan=4 | Elected in 1920.Lost renomination and died just before the end of the term.
| rowspan=4 nowrap | Mar 4, 1921 –Dec 7, 1926
| rowspan=4  | Republican
| rowspan=4 align=right | William B. McKinley
! rowspan=4 | 17

|- style="height:2em"
| 

|- style="height:2em"
! rowspan=7 | 16
| rowspan=7 align=left | Charles S. Deneen
| rowspan=7  | Republican
| rowspan=7 nowrap | Feb 26, 1925 –Mar 3, 1931
| Appointed to finish McCormick's term, having already been elected to the next term.

|- style="height:2em"
| rowspan=6 | Elected in 1924.Lost renomination.
| rowspan=6 | 19
| 

|- style="height:2em"
| Appointed to continue McKinley's term.Not seated/resigned.
| Dec 7, 1926
|  | Republican
| align=right | Frank L. Smith
! | 18

|- style="height:2em"
| rowspan=2 |  
| rowspan=2 nowrap | Dec 7, 1926 –Dec 3, 1928
| rowspan=2 colspan=3 | Vacant

|- style="height:2em"
| 
| rowspan=4 | 20

|- style="height:2em"
| rowspan=3 | Elected to finish the term.Lost re-election.
| rowspan=3 nowrap | Dec 3, 1928 –Mar 3, 1933
| rowspan=3  | Republican
| rowspan=3 align=right | Otis F. Glenn
! rowspan=3 | 19

|- style="height:2em"
| 

|- style="height:2em"
! rowspan=5 | 17
| rowspan=5 align=left | J. Hamilton Lewis
| rowspan=5  | Democratic
| rowspan=5 nowrap | Mar 4, 1931 –Apr 9, 1939
| rowspan=3 | Elected in 1930.
| rowspan=3 | 20
| 

|- style="height:2em"
| 
| rowspan=3 | 21
| rowspan=3 | Elected in 1932.Retired.
| rowspan=3 nowrap | Mar 4, 1933 –Jan 3, 1939
| rowspan=3  | Democratic
| rowspan=3 align=right | William H. Dieterich
! rowspan=3 | 20

|- style="height:2em"
| 

|- style="height:2em"
| rowspan=2 | Re-elected in 1936.Died.
| rowspan=6 | 21
| 

|- style="height:2em"
| 
| rowspan=6 | 22
| rowspan=6 | Elected in 1938.
| rowspan=9 nowrap | Jan 3, 1939 –Jan 3, 1951
| rowspan=9  | Democratic
| rowspan=9 align=right | Scott W. Lucas
! rowspan=9 | 21

|- style="height:2em"
| colspan=3 | Vacant
| nowrap | Apr 9, 1939 –Apr 14, 1939
|  

|- style="height:2em"
! 18
| align=left | James M. Slattery
|  | Democratic
| nowrap | Apr 14, 1939 –Nov 21, 1940
| Appointed to continue Lewis's term.Lost election to finish Lewis's term.

|- style="height:2em"
! rowspan=5 | 19
| rowspan=5 align=left | Charles W. Brooks
| rowspan=5  | Republican
| rowspan=5 nowrap | Nov 22, 1940 –Jan 3, 1949
| rowspan=2 | Elected to finish Lewis's term.

|- style="height:2em"
| 

|- style="height:2em"
| rowspan=3 | Re-elected in 1942.Lost re-election.
| rowspan=3 | 22
| 

|- style="height:2em"
| 
| rowspan=3 | 23
| rowspan=3 | Re-elected in 1944.Lost re-election.

|- style="height:2em"
| 

|- style="height:2em"
! rowspan=9 | 20
| rowspan=9 align=left | Paul Douglas
| rowspan=9  | Democratic
| rowspan=9 nowrap | Jan 3, 1949 –Jan 3, 1967
| rowspan=3 | Elected in 1948.
| rowspan=3 | 23
| 

|- style="height:2em"
| 
| rowspan=3 | 24
| rowspan=3 | Elected in 1950.
| rowspan=10 nowrap | Jan 3, 1951 –Sep 7, 1969
| rowspan=10  | Republican
| rowspan=10 align=right | Everett Dirksen
! rowspan=10 | 22

|- style="height:2em"
| 

|- style="height:2em"
| rowspan=3 | Re-elected in 1954.
| rowspan=3 | 24
| 

|- style="height:2em"
| 
| rowspan=3 | 25
| rowspan=3 | Re-elected in 1956.

|- style="height:2em"
| 

|- style="height:2em"
| rowspan=3 | Re-elected in 1960.Lost re-election.
| rowspan=3 | 25
| 

|- style="height:2em"
| 
| rowspan=3 | 26
| rowspan=3 | Re-elected in 1962.

|- style="height:2em"
| 

|- style="height:2em"
! rowspan=13 | 21
| rowspan=13 align=left | Charles H. Percy
| rowspan=13  | Republican
| rowspan=13 nowrap | Jan 3, 1967 –Jan 3, 1985
| rowspan=7 | Elected in 1966.
| rowspan=7 | 26
| 

|- style="height:2em"
| 
| rowspan=7 | 27
| Re-elected in 1968.Died.

|- style="height:2em"
|  
| nowrap | Sep 7, 1969 –Sep 17, 1969
| colspan=3 | Vacant

|- style="height:2em"
| Appointed to continue Dirksen's term.Lost election to finish Dirksen's term.
| nowrap | Sep 17, 1969 –Nov 3, 1970
|  | Republican
| align=right | Ralph T. Smith
! 23

|- style="height:2em"
|  
| nowrap | Nov 3, 1970 –Nov 17, 1970
| colspan=3 | Vacant

|- style="height:2em"
| rowspan=3 | Elected to finish Dirksen's term.
| rowspan=6 nowrap | Nov 17, 1970 –Jan 3, 1981
| rowspan=6  | Democratic
| rowspan=6 align=right | Adlai Stevenson III
! rowspan=6 | 24

|- style="height:2em"
| 

|- style="height:2em"
| rowspan=3 | Re-elected in 1972.
| rowspan=3 | 27
| 

|- style="height:2em"
| 
| rowspan=3 | 28
| rowspan=3 | Re-elected in 1974.Retired.

|- style="height:2em"
| 

|- style="height:2em"
| rowspan=3 | Re-elected in 1978.Lost re-election.
| rowspan=3 | 28
| 

|- style="height:2em"
| 
| rowspan=3 | 29
| rowspan=3 | Elected in 1980.
| rowspan=6 nowrap | Jan 3, 1981 –Jan 3, 1993
| rowspan=6  | Democratic
| rowspan=6 align=right | Alan J. Dixon
! rowspan=6 | 25

|- style="height:2em"
| 

|- style="height:2em"
! rowspan=6 | 22
| rowspan=6 align=left |Paul Simon
| rowspan=6  | Democratic
| rowspan=6 nowrap | Jan 3, 1985 –Jan 3, 1997
| rowspan=3 | Elected in 1984.
| rowspan=3 | 29
| 

|- style="height:2em"
| 
| rowspan=3 | 30
| rowspan=3 | Re-elected in 1986.Lost renomination.

|- style="height:2em"
| 

|- style="height:2em"
| rowspan=3 | Re-elected in 1990.Retired.
| rowspan=3 | 30
| 

|- style="height:2em"
| 
| rowspan=3 | 31
| rowspan=3 | Elected in 1992.Lost re-election.
| rowspan=3 nowrap | Jan 3, 1993 –Jan 3, 1999
| rowspan=3  | Democratic
| rowspan=3 align=right | Carol Moseley Braun
! rowspan=3 | 26

|- style="height:2em"
| 

|- style="height:2em"
! rowspan=18 | 23
| rowspan=18 align=left | Dick Durbin
| rowspan=18  | Democratic
| rowspan=18 nowrap | Jan 3, 1997 –Present
| rowspan=3 | Elected in 1996.
| rowspan=3 | 31
| 

|- style="height:2em"
| 
| rowspan=3 | 32
| rowspan=3 | Elected in 1998.Retired.
| rowspan=3 nowrap | Jan 3, 1999 –Jan 3, 2005
| rowspan=3  | Republican
| rowspan=3 align=right | Peter Fitzgerald
! rowspan=3 | 27

|- style="height:2em"
| 

|- style="height:2em"
| rowspan=4 | Re-elected in 2002.
| rowspan=4 | 32
| 

|- style="height:2em"
| 
| rowspan=6 | 33
| rowspan=2 | Elected in 2004.Resigned to become U.S. President.
| rowspan=2 nowrap | Jan 3, 2005 –Nov 16, 2008
| rowspan=2  | Democratic
| rowspan=2 align=right | Barack Obama
! rowspan=2 | 28

|- style="height:2em"
| 

|- style="height:2em"
| rowspan=2 |  
| rowspan=2 nowrap | Nov 16, 2008 –Jan 12, 2009
| rowspan=2 colspan=3 | Vacant

|- style="height:2em"
| rowspan=5 | Re-elected in 2008.
| rowspan=5 | 33
| 

|- style="height:2em"
| Appointed to continue Obama's term.<efn | Appointed to continue Obama's term, certified late.Retired when successor qualified.
|  | Jan 12, 2009–Nov 29, 2010
|  | Democratic
| align=right | Roland Burris
! 29

|- style="height:2em"
| Elected to finish Obama's term.
| rowspan=4 nowrap | Nov 29, 2010 –Jan 3, 2017
| rowspan=4  | Republican
| rowspan=4 align=right | Mark Kirk
! rowspan=4 | 30

|- style="height:2em"
| 
| rowspan=3 | 34
| rowspan=3 | Elected to full term in 2010.Lost re-election.

|- style="height:2em"
| 

|- style="height:2em"
| rowspan=3 | Re-elected in 2014.
| rowspan=3 | 34
| 

|- style="height:2em"
| 
| rowspan=3 | 35
| rowspan=3 | Elected in 2016.
| rowspan=6 nowrap | Jan 3, 2017 –Present
| rowspan=6  | Democratic
| rowspan=6 align=right | Tammy Duckworth
! rowspan=6 | 31

|- style="height:2em"
| 

|- style="height:2em"
| rowspan=3 |Re-elected in 2020.
| rowspan=3 | 35
| 

|- style="height:2em"
| 
| rowspan=3|36
| rowspan=3 | Re-elected in 2022.

|- style="height:2em"
| 

|- style="height:2em"
| rowspan=2 colspan=5 | To be determined in the 2026 election.
| rowspan=2| 36
| 

|- style="height:2em"
| 
| 37
| colspan=5 | To be determined in the 2028 election.

See also

 List of United States representatives from Illinois
 United States congressional delegations from Illinois
 Elections in Illinois

Notes

References

External links 
 
 
 

 
United States Senators
Illinois